Irene Abel (born 12 February 1953) is a retired German artistic gymnast. She competed in the 1972 Summer Olympics and won a silver medal with the East German team. Her best individual result was seventh place in the vault. She won another silver team medal at the 1974 World Championships.

After retiring from competitions she worked as gymnastics coach at her club Dynamo Berlin. She also trains her daughter Katja (born 1983), who competed at the 2008 Olympics.

References

1953 births
Living people
People from East Berlin
Gymnasts from Berlin
German female artistic gymnasts
Medalists at the World Artistic Gymnastics Championships
Olympic silver medalists for East Germany
Olympic gymnasts of Germany
Gymnasts at the 1972 Summer Olympics
Olympic medalists in gymnastics
Medalists at the 1972 Summer Olympics
Recipients of the Patriotic Order of Merit in bronze
20th-century German women